Kurt Lundqvist (20 November 1914 – 26 March 1976) was a Swedish track and field athlete who competed in the high jump. He was the 1938 European champion in the event.

He won his first national title in 1933 and established himself as the top Swedish competitor that decade with four further wins at the Swedish Athletics Championships from 1935 to 1938, interrupted only by Nils Bergström. He featured in the top three nationally in 1939, 1941 and 1942. A Swedish record came for Lundqvist in 1937 – his jump of  improved Karl Österberg's twelve-year-old mark.

His win at the second edition of this competition marked the beginning of a period of Swedish dominance in that event, with Anton Bolinder, Bengt Nilsson and Rickard Dahl maintaining the European title for Sweden at four of the following five editions. Lundqvist was also Sweden's first ever European champion in a jumping event and the second Swedish European field medallist after Harald Andersson.

For his achievements he was given the Stora grabbars märke for athletics (the 87th recipient of the award). He did not compete in a major event after 1938 and the onset of World War II the year after ended chance at further high level sports competition.

See also
List of European Athletics Championships medalists (men)

References

1914 births
1976 deaths
Swedish male high jumpers
European Athletics Championships medalists
Place of birth missing